Chaudhary Surender Singh (15 November 1946 - 31 March 2005) was an Indian politician from the Haryana Vikas Party and twice (1996, 1998) represented Bhiwani constituency in the Lok Sabha, was a Rajya Sabha member 1986–1992, and twice represented Tosham in Haryana Vidhan Sabha. His widow won the Tosham by-poll caused by his death.

Education

He was educated at Panjab University, Chandigarh and completed his Master of Arts and Bachelor of Law.

Profession

Advocate and agriculturist, he was son of former Haryana Chief Minister Bansi Lal.

Positions held

1971-73		General-Secretary, District Congress
		Committee (D.C.C.), Bhiwani

1973-77		Treasurer, Indian Youth Congress

1977-86		Member, Haryana Vidhan Sabha

1982-83	 	Cabinet Minister, Agriculture and Wildlife
		Preservation, Haryana

1986-92		Member, Rajya Sabha

		Member, Committee on Petitions

		Member, House Committee

		Member, Consultative Committee, Ministry of
		Civil Aviation

		Member, Consultative Committee, Ministry of Defence

1989-90		Member, Public Accounts Committee

1996		Elected to 11th Lok Sabha

1996-97		Member, Committee on Human Resource Development

		Member, Railway Convention Committee

		Member, Hindi Salahakar Samiti, Ministry of Environment
		and Forests

		Member, Committee on Science and Technology, Environment
		and Forests

		Member, Consultative Committee, Ministry of Defence

1998		Re-elected to 12th Lok Sabha (2nd term)

1998-99		Member, Committee on Subordinate Legislation

		Member, Committee on Public Undertakings

		Member, Committee on Communications its
		Sub Committee 'A' on Department of Telecom

		Member, Consultative Committee, Ministry of
		Civil Aviation

Special interests
Travelling, participation in the youth activities; including: sports, cultural activities and debates.

Favourite pastimes and recreation
Reading and sports

Sports and clubs
Outstanding sportsman during college days, keen interest in cricket

Countries visited
Canada, Finland, France, Switzerland, US and the former USSR; Member, Indian Parliamentary Delegation to UK, 1998

Other information
He also held positions including President, Bar Association, Bhiwani, 1970–71, chairman, (i) Bar Council of Punjab and Haryana; (ii) Bar Council of Punjab and Haryana High Court, Chandigarh, 1978 and 1980–82; Member (i) Executive Council, Kurukshetra University;  (ii) Executive Committee, C.R. Jat College, Hissar; (iii) Executive Committee, Indian Olympic Association; (iv) All India Congress Committee (Indira); and (v)Pradesh Congress Committee (Indira), Haryana.

Death
On 31 March 2005 Singh aged 59, died along with noted industrialist and Power Minister Om Prakash Jindal, in a chopper crash during an emergency landing in Saharanpur district of Uttar Pradesh. He was survived by his wife Kiran Choudhry and daughter Shruti Choudhry.

Sources

References

People from Bhiwani
People from Bhiwani district
Lok Sabha members from Haryana
1946 births
2005 deaths
Rajya Sabha members from Haryana
Victims of helicopter accidents or incidents
Victims of aviation accidents or incidents in India
Indian National Congress politicians
India MPs 1996–1997
India MPs 1998–1999